The fifteenth series of the British medical drama television series Casualty commenced airing in the United Kingdom on BBC One on 16 September 2000 and finished on 28 April 2001. It saw another increase, this time to 36 episodes, including two hour-long self-contained 'specials', "Sympathy for the Devil" (episode 8) and "Something from the Heart" (episode 23), which were shown in addition to the regular Saturday night episodes.

Cast

Main characters 

Donna Alexander as Penny Hutchens (until episode 36)
Jan Anderson as Chloe Hill
Adjoa Andoh as Colette Kierney (from episode 1)
Pal Aron as Adam Osman (until episode 6)
Ian Bleasdale as Josh Griffiths
Philip Bretherton as Andrew Bower (episodes 12−36)
Michelle Butterly as Mel Dyson (until episode 36)
Robert Gwilym as Max Gallagher
Sandra Huggett as Holly Miles (until episode 36)
Ben Keaton as Spencer (from episode 1)
Ian Kelsey as Patrick Spiller
Kwame Kwei-Armah as Fin Newton
Grant Masters as Dan Robinson (episodes 1−36)
Ronnie McCann as Barney Woolfe (until episode 36)
Will Mellor as Jack Vincent (from episode 31)
Zita Sattar as Anna Paul (from episode 28)
Cathy Shipton as Lisa "Duffy" Duffin
Derek Thompson as Charlie Fairhead
Rebecca Wheatley as Amy Howard (until episode 29)

Recurring characters 

Arthur Caulfield as Ben Lewis (episode 18)
Janet Dibley as Amanda Lewis (episodes 18−35)
Kieron Forsyth as Tom Harvey (episodes 13−36)
Callum Ray as Louis Fairhead (episodes 5−11)

Guest characters 

Sam Barriscale as Reuben Hurst (episodes 2−6)
Christopher Colquhoun as Luke Hutchens (episodes 32−33)
Shelley Conn as Daljit Ramanee (episodes 5−6)
Winston Ellis as Joe Bickman (episodes 27−28)
Glenna Forster-Jones as Mrs. Kierney (episodes 31 and 34)
Steve Huison as Phil Rees (episodes 5−6)
Simon Merrells as Ed Jamieson (episodes 35−36)
Caroline Paterson as Janine Brown (episodes 33−36)
Raymond Pickard as Mikey Rees (episodes 5−6)
Nicholas Sidi as Nick Costello (episodes 3−4)
Morag Siller as Leona (episode 6)
Nicola Stephenson as Julie Fitzjohn (episode 22)
Nicholas Tizzard as PC McCormack (episodes 3−23)
Charis Thomas as Natalie Mackay (episodes 35−36)

Episodes

References

External links
 Casualty series 15 at the Internet Movie Database

15
2000 British television seasons
2001 British television seasons